Paul Edward Hayes (born 20 September 1983) is an English former professional footballer who lasted played for  club Haverhill Rovers.

As a player he was a forward who made more than 500 appearances for 11 clubs in all three divisions of the English Football League most notably for Scunthorpe United, Barnsley and Wycombe Wanderers. He also played professionally for Norwich City, Huddersfield Town, Charlton Athletic, Preston North End, Brentford, Crawley Town, Plymouth Argyle and Newport County. He played his latter career in non-League football for Hemel Hempstead Town, AFC Sudbury, Romford, Meridian VP, Faversham Town, Chatham Town and Haverhill Rovers. Hayes has held sporting director roles at non-League clubs Chatham Town and Bowers & Pitsea.

Playing career

Norwich City
Hayes started his footballing career as a schoolboy with Norwich City, whom he joined as a 13-year-old. Hayes' first involvement with the first team came in pre-season prior to Norwich's 2001–02 First Division campaign, in which he scored in friendlies against Wroxham, Colchester United and Premier League club Arsenal. He was an unused substitute during the final two matches of the regular season. He failed to feature during Norwich's unsuccessful playoff campaign. Hayes failed to feature at all during the early part of the 2002–03 season and became frustrated at his lack of first team opportunities, with forwards Iwan Roberts, Paul McVeigh, David Nielsen, Alex Notman, Zema Abbey and Ian Henderson ahead of him in the pecking order. He spent periods on trial at Third Division clubs Torquay United and Scunthorpe United and had his Norwich academy contract cancelled on 3 December 2002.

Scunthorpe United
Hayes signed a youth contract with Third Division club Scunthorpe United in December 2002. He scored his first goal for the club on his second appearance, with Scunthorpe's fourth goal in a 4–1 win over Southend United on 25 January 2003. On 19 March 2003, Hayes signed a professional contract with Scunthorpe. He scored eight goals in 20 games during the 2002–03 season, though the campaign ended with a heartbreaking playoff semi-final defeat to Lincoln City. Hayes became a regular starter the following season, making 45 appearances and scoring seven goals as Scunthorpe narrowly avoided relegation to the Conference.

Hayes scored 19 goals during the 2004–05 season to help Scunthorpe gain automatic promotion to League One. Hayes was in red hot form during October and November 2004, scoring 10 goals in as many games. A highlight of his season was scoring the opener against Premier League club Chelsea in an FA Cup Third Round at Stamford Bridge on 8 January 2005, though Chelsea eventually ran out 3–1 winners. Hayes departed Glanford Park on 2 June 2005, having scored 34 goals in 116 appearances for the club.

Barnsley
Hayes joined League One club Barnsley on 2 June 2005 and made 56 appearances and scored 13 goals during the 2005–06 season. He scored the opener in the 2006 League One play-off final against Swansea City and a 2–2 scoreline at the end of extra time saw the game go to penalties, with Hayes converting his spot kick to help Barnsley to a 4–3 shootout win and promotion to the Championship. 

Hayes made 33 appearances for Barnsley during the 2006–07 season and scored five goals, which included a spell of four goals in six games early in the season. After falling behind Hungarian forward duo István Ferenczi and Péter Rajczi during the second half of the season, Hayes joined League One club Huddersfield Town on a one-month loan on 23 February 2007. On 10 March, he scored his only goal for the club in a 2–0 home victory over local neighbours Bradford City. Having joined with a view to a permanent move, he failed to win a contract or a loan extension and returned to Barnsley on 18 March, after scoring one goal in four appearances for Huddersfield Town. Hayes departed Oakwell on 13 June 2007 and made 89 appearances and scored 18 goals during two seasons with the club.

Return to Scunthorpe United
Hayes returned to Scunthorpe United (now playing in the Championship) on a three-year contract on 13 June 2007, for a fee which was later settled by tribunal. He made 42 appearances during the 2007–08 season, but a run of five goals in the last three games of the season couldn't save the Iron from relegation to League One. Hayes found his form again during the 2008–09 season, making 57 appearances and scoring 19 goals and helped the Iron to the Football League Trophy Final and to promotion to the Championship via the playoffs.

Hayes had a solid 2009–10 season in the Championship, making 51 appearances and scoring 13 goals, which included a goal against Manchester City in a 4–2 FA Cup fourth round defeat on 24 January 2010. A contract dispute saw Hayes attract attention from former club Norwich City late in the season, but he left Glanford Park on 10 May 2010. Hayes made 150 appearances and scored 40 goals in his second spell with Scunthorpe United and was voted the club's 2009–10 Player of the Year.

Preston North End
On 10 May 2010, Hayes signed a three-year contract at Championship club Preston North End on a free transfer. He made 26 appearances and scored four goals for the financially-stricken club during the 2010–11 season. On 28 October 2010, Hayes returned to Barnsley on emergency loan until 1 January 2011, as a makeweight in the deal to extend Iain Hume's loan at Preston North End. He made seven appearances without scoring and returned to Deepdale when his loan expired. Personal problems and relegation to League One led Hayes to terminate his contract on 17 June 2011.

Charlton Athletic
On 21 June 2011, it was announced that Hayes was a third of a triple signing completed by League One club Charlton Athletic. He scored his first goal for Charlton in a 2–1 away win over Notts County on 13 August 2011. After the arrival and immediate impact of Yann Kermorgant, opportunities became limited for Hayes. On 24 February 2012, Hayes and Charlton Athletic teammate Gary Doherty joined League One club Wycombe Wanderers on loan until the end of the 2011–12 season. He scored six goals in six appearances and was recalled by Charlton Athletic on 23 March. He made 22 appearances and scored three goals during the 2011–12 season as Charlton won the League One title and secured promotion to the Championship. Hayes was made available for transfer by manager Chris Powell prior to the beginning of the 2012–13 season and departed the club on 20 August 2012.

Brentford
On 20 August 2012, Hayes signed a three-year contract with League One club Brentford on a free transfer. He made his debut as a substitute against Yeovil Town on 21 August 2012 and missed a penalty in a 3–1 defeat. He finally scored his first goals for the club with a brace in a 2–2 draw with Hartlepool United on 27 October, but after scoring just four further goals over the following five months, he joined League One club Crawley Town on one-month loan on 11 March 2013, which was later extended until the end of the season. He scored two goals in 11 appearances and returned to Brentford on 30 April. Hayes played a part in each of the Bees' three League One playoff matches, but the club missed out on promotion to the Championship after a 2–1 playoff final defeat to Yeovil Town.

Despite scoring three goals during the 2013–14 pre-season, Hayes was frozen out once the regular season started and was made available for loan by manager Uwe Rösler. He made his only appearance of the season in a 3–2 League Cup first round victory over hometown club Dagenham & Redbridge on 6 August. Hayes joined League Two club Plymouth Argyle on a one-month loan on 4 October 2013. He failed to score in six appearances for the Pilgrims and returned to Brentford when his loan expired. Hayes had his contract terminated on 3 December 2013 and made 33 appearances and scored six goals during 15 months at Griffin Park.

Scunthorpe United (third spell)
Hayes signed for Scunthorpe (now in League Two) for a third time in his career on 17 December 2013, on a contract running until the end of the 2013–14 season. He scored four goals in 16 appearances and helped the Iron to promotion to League One with a second-place finish. Hayes was released at the end of the season. Across his three spells with Scunthorpe United, Hayes made 282 appearances and scored 78 goals.

Return to Wycombe Wanderers
On 15 May 2014, Hayes returned to League Two club Wycombe Wanderers on a two-year contract. In just over three seasons with the Chairboys, he scored 27 goals in 120 appearances and helped the club to the 2015 League Two play-off final, which was lost on penalties to Southend United. Hayes left Wycombe by mutual consent on 29 August 2017 and across his two spells with the club, he made 126 appearances and scored 33 goals.

Hemel Hempstead Town
On 22 September 2017, Hayes dropped out of the EFL for the first team in his career to join National League South club Hemel Hempstead Town. Despite joining the club in a bid to regain his fitness, he failed to win a call into a squad before departing three weeks later.

Newport County
On 17 October 2017, Hayes returned to the Football League to join League Two club Newport County on a contract running until the end of the 2017–18 season. Due to registration regulations, Hayes was not be able to make his Exiles debut until after 3 January 2018. Hayes finished the season with 14 appearances, three goals and was released when his contract expired.

Return to non-League football 
On 9 August 2018, Hayes dropped back into non-League football to join Isthmian League North Division club AFC Sudbury on a two-year contract. He scored 12 goals in 34 appearances during the 2018–19 season and retired in June 2019. In mid-November 2019, Hayes returned to football as a player with Isthmian League North Division club Romford. After one appearance, he transferred to Southern Counties East League First Division club Meridian VP, with whom he remained until 7 January 2020, when he transferred to Isthmian League South East Division club Faversham Town. Hayes made 10 appearances before joining Southern Counties East League Premier Division club Chatham Town in a player-sporting director capacity March 2020. He made three appearances and scored one goal across the 2019–20 and 2020–21 seasons. Concurrent with his director of football role at Isthmian League Premier Division club Bowers & Pitsea, Hayes made three cup appearances during the first half of the 2022–23 season. On 6 January 2023, he joined Eastern Counties League Premier Division club Haverhill Rovers and made five appearances before departing the club in mid-February 2023.

Backroom career 
Hayes served Southern Counties East League Premier Division club Chatham Town as sporting director between 2020 and 2022. On 1 May 2022, Hayes was appointed director of football at Isthmian League Premier Division club Bowers & Pitsea. He departed the role in January 2023.

Personal life
Born in Dagenham, Essex, Hayes grew up in East London and went to Barclay Junior School in Leyton, where he captained the school football team from the age of seven. He later attended Norlington School for Boys and The Bromfords School in Wickford, Essex. His older brother, Martin, is a football manager and former player and his son Noah was a member of the Charlton Athletic Academy. After retiring from football, Hayes began a career as an agent and launched Aspiro Lifestyle Management.

Career statistics

Honours
Scunthorpe United
 EFL League One play-offs: 2009
 EFL League Two second-place promotion: 2004–05, 2013–14

Barnsley
 EFL League One play-offs: 2006

Charlton Athletic
 EFL League One: 2011–12

Individual
 Scunthorpe United Player of the Year: 2009–10

References

External links

1982 births
Living people
Footballers from Dagenham
English footballers
Association football forwards
Norwich City F.C. players
Scunthorpe United F.C. players
Barnsley F.C. players
Huddersfield Town A.F.C. players
Preston North End F.C. players
Charlton Athletic F.C. players
Wycombe Wanderers F.C. players
Brentford F.C. players
Crawley Town F.C. players
Plymouth Argyle F.C. players
Newport County A.F.C. players
English Football League players
A.F.C. Sudbury players
Isthmian League players
Romford F.C. players
Faversham Town F.C. players
Chatham Town F.C. players
Haverhill Rovers F.C. players
Eastern Counties Football League players
Bowers & Pitsea F.C. players